Huang Bowen (born 15 February 1996) is a Chinese professional footballer who currently plays as a full-back for Wuhan Zall.

Club career
Huang Bowen would play for the Shanghai Shenhua youth team and was sent to Spain to study abroad before returning to China and joining second tier football club Wuhan Zall on the 27 February 2016 on loan. He would make his debut on 12 March 2016 against Beijing Enterprises Group in a league game that ended in a 1-1 draw. Throughout the season he would quickly establish himself as a regular within the team and at the start of the following season, Huang would sign a four year contract with the club. This would be followed by winning the 2018 China League One division and promotion to the Chinese Super League.

Career statistics
.

Honours

Club
Wuhan Zall
 China League One: 2018

References

External links

1996 births
Living people
Sportspeople from Anhui
Chinese footballers
Chinese expatriate footballers
Association football defenders
China League One players
Chinese Super League players
Shanghai Shenhua F.C. players
Wuhan F.C. players
Chinese expatriate sportspeople in Spain
Expatriate footballers in Spain